Void is the second EP by the metalcore band, Destroy the Runner. This is the first release from the band in 8 years. The album was released through digital and vinyl.

Track listing

Personnel
Destroy the Runner
 Kyle Setter – unclean vocals
 Duane Reed – rhythm guitars, bass guitars, vocals, engineering
 Nick "Maldy" Maldonado – lead guitars, bass guitars
 Marc Kohlbry – drums

Production
 Andreas Magnusson – mixing
 Alan Douches – mastering
 Daniel Castleman – engineering
 Joey Bradford – engineering
 Tanner Sparks – additional editing
 Jordan Butcher (Studio Workhorse) – artwork

References

Destroy the Runner albums
2016 EPs